Archibald Hope may refer to:

Archibald Hope, Lord Rankeillor (1639–1706), Scottish advocate and judge
Sir Archibald Hope, 9th Baronet (1735–1794), Scottish aristocrat
Sir Archibald Philip Hope, 17th Baronet (1912–1987), Scottish WWII aviator